Cat among the Pigeons is a young adult novel by Julia Golding, published in 2006. It is a story about Pedro the slave's fight for freedom. The main character is Cat, a girl of around 12 who is Pedro's best friend.

Plot summary
The setting is London in the late 18th century when slavery has just been ruled illegal in England but is still common in the British West Indies. Things are fine but then trouble rises as Pedro's old slave master, Mr. Hawkins, comes to London and tries to reclaim Pedro as one of his properties. He is at first thwarted by Cat but he vows to return.

But not without a fight as Pedro's friends, Cat, Frank, Lizzie, Syd and the gang try to secure his freedom. Once again, Cat finds trouble following her once more as she is chased around in London by the Bow Street Runners coming for her arrest for biting Mr Hawkins after he taunted her. Disguising herself as a boy with the help of her friends, Frank and Charlie, she enters an aristocratic boarding school and learns things like Latin and fencing that girls are never taught. Cat is bullied for being clever and a 'pretty boy' by Richmond, the son of a plantation owner. When they find Cat with a medallion abhorring slavery Richmond and his gang beat Cat up. When Syd arrives bringing sausages as a decoy, he's furious and wants to take Cat home immediately, but soon realises that she's safe where she is as the Bow Street Runners are still looking for her.

Meanwhile Pedro is caught and is being held by Billy Shepherd for Mr Hawkins. Cat finds out where he is but can't inform the police as she has no proof against Mr Hawkins. Finally, as Mr Hawkins is about to set sail with Pedro on board Cat arrives with Lizzie, Frank, Mr Equaino and the Duchess to rescue Pedro. The Magistrate is called and Cat blackmails Mr Hawkins into setting Pedro free.

References 

2006 British novels
Children's historical novels
British children's novels
Novels by Julia Golding
Novels about slavery
Novels set in London
2006 children's books
British children's books
Egmont Books books